The 6.5-06 A-Square is a centerfire rifle cartridge that originated as a wildcat, based on the popular .30-06 Springfield. A-Square standardized the dimensions of the cartridge and submitted them to SAAMI in 1997.

Design
The 6.5-06 A-Square uses a .264" diameter bullet loaded into a modified .30-06 Springfield cartridge. The neck is reduced to accept the smaller bullet, the shoulder is longer than that of the parent cartridge, and it has a 17.5 degree shoulder angle leading to the neck of the case, where the bullet is seated.  The Ackley Improved version of the cartridge uses a sharper shoulder angle and has a case capacity of 72 gr of water.

Uses
The 6.5-06 A-Square has power similar to that of the .270 Winchester and .308 Winchester, making it suitable for hunting medium-sized game such as deer and black bear.
It is also used in competitions such as F-Class and Benchrest formats.

Availability of ammunition
Currently (2011) none of the major commercial ammunition manufacturers offer factory loaded 6.5-06 A-Square ammunition. There are smaller companies that custom load the cartridge however, and hand-loading can be accomplished using the proper set of dies and using .25-06 Remington, .270 Winchester, or .30-06 Springfield brass and making the proper modifications to fit the 6.5-06 A-Square chamber. After firing, the brass from the original cartridge (.25-06 Remington, .270 Winchester, or .30-06 Springfield) will be fire-formed to the exact dimensions of the 6.5-06 A-Square chamber.

Firearms chambered for 6.5-06 A-Square
As of 2011, A-Square listed two different rifles factory chambered in 6.5-06 A-Square; the Hamilcar and the Genghis Khan. Several of the major custom barrel manufacturers offer the 6.5-06 A-Square (sometimes listed simply as 6.5-06) chamber as an option for builders of custom rifles. However, On 15 February 2012, the A-Square Company ceased to exist.

See also
List of rifle cartridges
Glossary of firearms terminology
.30-06 Springfield wildcat cartridges

References

Pistol and rifle cartridges
Wildcat cartridges